Charlotte Noelle Sweeney (born 1969) is an American lawyer from Colorado who serves as a United States district judge of the United States District Court for the District of Colorado.

Early life and education 

Sweeney was born in 1969 in Englewood, Colorado. She received a Bachelor of Science from California Lutheran University in 1991 and a Juris Doctor from the Sturm College of Law in 1995.

Career 

Sweeney began her career as an associate with LaFond & Clausen, LLC in 1995 and was named a partner at the firm in 1998. From 1999 to 2008, she was a partner with LaFond & Sweeney, LLC. Since 2008, she has been a partner at Sweeney & Bechtold, LLC., where she focused on civil rights and employment discrimination law. In 2019, she helped draft the Equal Pay for Equal Work Act in Colorado.

Federal judicial service 

In May 2021, Sweeney was one of three candidates recommended to the White House by Senators John Hickenlooper and Michael Bennet. On August 5, 2021, President Joe Biden nominated Sweeney to serve as a United States district judge of the United States District Court for the District of Colorado. President Biden nominated Sweeney to the seat vacated by Judge R. Brooke Jackson, who assumed senior status on September 30, 2021. On October 20, 2021, a hearing on her nomination was held before the Senate Judiciary Committee. On December 2, 2021, the committee were deadlocked on her nomination by an 11–11 vote. On January 3, 2022, her nomination was returned to the President under Rule XXXI, Paragraph 6 of the United States Senate; she was renominated the same day. On January 20, 2022, the committee were deadlocked on her nomination by an 11–11 vote. On May 11, 2022, the Senate discharged her nomination from committee by a 51–49 vote. On May 24, 2022, the Senate invoked cloture on her nomination by a 48–42 vote. On May 25, 2022, her nomination was confirmed by a 48–46 vote. She received her judicial commission on July 18, 2022. She is the first openly LGBT federal judge in Colorado and the first openly LGBT woman to serve as a federal district court judge west of the Mississippi.

Associations and memberships 

Sweeney previously led the labor and employment section of the Colorado Bar Association as well as the Plaintiff Employment Lawyers Association. She is a member of the Colorado LGBT Bar Association. From 2016 to 2022, she served on the board of directors of the Matthew Shepard Foundation, and as interim treasurer from 2021 to 2022.

See also 
 List of LGBT jurists in the United States

References

External links 
 

1969 births
Living people
20th-century American women lawyers
20th-century American lawyers
21st-century American judges
21st-century American women lawyers
21st-century American LGBT people
21st-century American lawyers
21st-century American women judges
California Lutheran University alumni
Colorado lawyers
Judges of the United States District Court for the District of Colorado
LGBT appointed officials in the United States
LGBT judges
LGBT lawyers
People from Englewood, Colorado
United States district court judges appointed by Joe Biden
University of Denver alumni